Zaineb Al-Samarai (born 22 October 1987) is a Norwegian politician for the Labour Party. She served as a deputy representative to the Parliament of Norway from Oslo during the term 2017–2021. Hailing from Iraq, her family fled to Norway in 1994. Settling in Holmlia, Al-Samarai was elected to Oslo city council in 2011 and 2015 and has chaired Holmlia SK. She is a jurist by education.

References

1987 births
Living people
Iraqi emigrants to Norway
University of Oslo alumni
Deputy members of the Storting
Labour Party (Norway) politicians
Politicians from Oslo
Norwegian women in politics
Norwegian sports executives and administrators
Women members of the Storting
21st-century Norwegian politicians